Ekpedeme Friday "Ekpe" Udoh (born May 20, 1987) is a Nigerian-American professional basketball player for the Kyoto Hannaryz of the Japanese B.League. He played college basketball for the Michigan Wolverines and the Baylor Bears. In the 2010 NBA draft, he was selected by the Golden State Warriors with the sixth overall pick.
 
With a 7'4 " wingspan, Udoh was the Big 12 Conference's leading shot blocker during the 2009–10 season.  He led the conference in his only season at Baylor (2009–10), after transferring from Michigan where, as a sophomore for the 2007–08 Michigan Wolverines, he led the Big Ten Conference in blocked shots with 2.9 per game (92 blocks total) in 2007–08. A two−time All-EuroLeague Team selection, Udoh led Fenerbahçe to a EuroLeague title in 2017, earning the EuroLeague Final Four MVP award in the process.

Udoh was selected for the Nigerian national team for both the 2019 FIBA World Cup and the 2020 Olympic Games.

College career
Udoh played three seasons of college basketball, two at Michigan and one at Baylor, averaging 8.4 points, 6.3 rebounds, 1.5 assists and 2.8 blocks per game in 103 career games. In 2009–10, Udoh earned honorable mention All-American honors by the Associated Press, as well as being named to the All-Big 12 second team, Big 12 All-Defensive team, Big 12 Newcomer of the Year, Big 12 All-Rookie team, USBWA All-District VII team and NABC Division I All-District 8 second team.

On April 13, 2010, he declared for the NBA draft, foregoing his final year of college eligibility.

Professional career

Golden State Warriors (2010–2012)
Udoh was selected with the sixth overall pick in the 2010 NBA draft by the Golden State Warriors. Because of a wrist injury, Udoh did not make his NBA debut until December 11, 2010 against the Miami Heat in the final three minutes of the game, scoring two points.

Bnei Herzliya (2011)
On November 21, 2011, Udoh signed with Bnei Herzliya of Israel for the duration of the NBA lockout. In December 2011, he returned to the Warriors after managing just one game for Bnei where he recorded 22 points, 16 rebounds, 3 assists and 4 blocks.

Milwaukee Bucks (2012–2014)
On March 13, 2012, Udoh, along with Monta Ellis and Kwame Brown, was traded to the Milwaukee Bucks in exchange for Andrew Bogut and Stephen Jackson.

Los Angeles Clippers (2014–2015) 
On September 3, 2014, Udoh signed with the Los Angeles Clippers. Throughout the season, he appeared in 33 games, failing to secure larger playing time and role.

Fenerbahçe (2015–2017)
On July 28, 2015, Udoh signed a one-year deal with the Turkish club Fenerbahçe. In his first season with the team, Udoh already had a starting role, being one of the team's leaders. Fenerbahçe won the Turkish Cup, with 67–65 win over Darüşşafaka. Fenerbahçe also reached the final game of the 2016 EuroLeague Final Four, but fell short of winning the EuroLeague championship, after an overtime 96–101 loss to CSKA Moscow. Over 27 EuroLeague games, he averaged 12.6 points and 5.1 rebounds per game. At the end of the season, Fenerbahçe also won the Turkish League championship.

On July 11, 2016, Udoh re-signed with Fenerbahçe, on a 1+1 contract. In the 2016–17 season, Udoh won the EuroLeague championship with Fenerbahçe. He was named the EuroLeague Final Four MVP, after his performance in the Final Four. On July 14, 2017, he parted ways with Fenerbahçe in order to return to the NBA.

Utah Jazz (2017–2019)
On July 21, 2017, Udoh signed with the Utah Jazz for two years, $6.5M deal.

Beijing Ducks (2019–2020)
On July 7, 2019, Udoh signed with the Beijing Ducks for a one year contract.

Beijing Royal Fighters (2021)
On March 4, 2021, Ekpe Udoh signed with the Beijing Royal Fighters.

Virtus Bologna (2021–2022)
On July 18, 2021, Udoh signed a two-year deal with Virtus Bologna  of the Italian LBA. Virtus also plays in the EuroCup. On September 18, 2021, he suffered a serious patellar tendon injury during the quarterfinals of the 2021 Italian Supercup.<ref>Communication on Ekpe Udoh, Virtus Bologna'</ref> However, on September 21, the team won its second Supercup, defeating Olimpia Milano 90–84. However, after having ousted Lietkabelis, Ulm and Valencia in the first three rounds of the playoffs, on 11 May 2022, Virtus defeated Frutti Extra Bursaspor by 80–67 at the Segafredo Arena, winning its first EuroCup and qualifying for the EuroLeague after 14 years. However, despite having ended the regular season at the first place and having ousted 3–0 both Pesaro and Tortona in the first two rounds of playoffs, Virtus was defeated 4–2 in the national finals by Olimpia Milan.

Career statistics

NBA
Regular season

|-
| style="text-align:left;"| 
| style="text-align:left;"| Golden State
| 58 || 18 || 17.8 || .437 || — || .656 || 3.1 || .7 || .4 || 1.5 || 4.1
|-
| style="text-align:left;"| 
| style="text-align:left;"| Golden State
| 38 || 6 || 21.8 || .443 || — || .719 || 3.9 || .8 || .7 || 1.7 || 5.5
|-
| style="text-align:left;"| 
| style="text-align:left;"| Milwaukee
| 23 || 5 || 20.1 || .409 || .000 || .800 || 4.7 || 1.1 || .7 || 1.6 || 5.7
|-
| style="text-align:left;"| 
| style="text-align:left;"| Milwaukee
| 76 || 9 || 17.3 || .435 || .000 || .748 || 3.3 || .6 || .5 || 1.1 || 4.3
|-
| style="text-align:left;"| 
| style="text-align:left;"| Milwaukee
| 42 || 14 || 19.1 || .399 || — || .638 || 3.5 || .7 || .4 || 1.0 || 3.4
|-
| style="text-align:left;"| 
| style="text-align:left;"| L.A. Clippers
| 33 || 0 || 3.9 || .458 || — || .778 || .8 || .2 || .2 || .2 || .9
|-
| style="text-align:left;"| 
| style="text-align:left;"| Utah
| 63 || 3 || 12.9 || .500 || .000 || .750 || 2.4 || .8 || .7 || 1.2 || 2.6
|-
| style="text-align:left;"| 
| style="text-align:left;"| Utah
| 51 || 1 || 6.3 || .694 || — || .633 || 1.8 || .5 || .2 || .6 || 2.3
|- class="sortbottom"
| align="center" colspan="2"| Career
| 384 || 56 || 14.8 || .453 || .000 || .718 || 2.9 || .7 || .5 || 1.1 || 3.5

Playoffs

|-
| style="text-align:left;"| 2013
| style="text-align:left;"| Milwaukee
| 4 || 0 || 13.5 || .444 || - || - || 1.5 || .3 || .5 || .5 || 2.0
|-
| style="text-align:left;"| 2015
| style="text-align:left;"| L.A. Clippers
| 4 || 0 || 3.0 || .333 || - || - || .8 || .0 || .0 || .0 || .5
|-
| style="text-align:left;"| 2018
| style="text-align:left;"| Utah
| 6 || 0 || 3.5 || 1.000 || - || .000 || .5 || .0 || .0 || .3 || .3
|-
| style="text-align:left;"| 2019
| style="text-align:left;"| Utah
| 2 || 0 || 3.1 || .000 || - || - || .0 || .0 || .0 || .0 || .0
|- class="sortbottom"
| align="center" colspan="2"| Career
| 16 || 0 || 5.8 || .429 || - || .000 || .8 || .1 || .1 || .3 || .8

EuroLeague

|-
| style="text-align:left;"| 2015–16
| style="text-align:left;" rowspan=2| Fenerbahçe
| 27 || 24 || 27.8 || .555 || .000 || .768 || 5.1 || 1.3 || .7 || style="background:#cfecec;"|2.3 || 12.6 || 16.0
|-
| style="text-align:left;background:#AFE6BA;"| 2016–17†
| 31 || 22 || 32.0 || .584 || .000 || .644 || style="background:#cfecec;"|7.8 || 2.2 || 1.0 || style="background:#cfecec;"|2.2 || 12.1 || 20.7
|- class="sortbottom"
| align="center" colspan="2"| Career
| 58 || 46 || 30.0 || .570 || .000 || .700 || 6.5 || 1.8 || .9 || 2.2 || 12.3 || 18.5

Individual awards
EuroLeague Final Four MVP
EuroLeague 2016–17

EuroLeague MVP of the Month
EuroLeague 2015–16, April
EuroLeague Best Defender (2017) by Eurohoops''

EuroLeague Weekly MVPs
EuroLeague 2015–16 – Playoffs, Game 2, with 25 PIR
EuroLeague 2015–16 – Playoffs, Game 3, with 33 PIR
EuroLeague 2016–17 – Regular Season, Round 4, with 31 PIR

Personal life
Udoh is the son of Nigerian parents, Alice and Sam Udoh, and he has one older brother, Eddie, and two younger sisters, Esther and Sefon.

Udoh enjoys reading and runs a public, mostly online book club in his spare time. He is quoted as saying, "If I can play in the NBA and still find time to read — so can you!".

References

External links

 
 Baylor Bears bio
 EuroLeague profile
 
 
 Udoh's Book Club

1987 births
Living people
2019 FIBA Basketball World Cup players
20th-century African-American people
21st-century African-American sportspeople
African-American basketball players
American expatriate basketball people in China
American expatriate basketball people in Turkey
American men's basketball players
American sportspeople of Nigerian descent
Basketball players at the 2020 Summer Olympics
Basketball players from Oklahoma
Baylor Bears men's basketball players
Beijing Ducks players
Centers (basketball)
Fenerbahçe men's basketball players
Golden State Warriors draft picks
Golden State Warriors players
Los Angeles Clippers players
Michigan Wolverines men's basketball players
Milwaukee Bucks players
Nigerian expatriate basketball people in Turkey
Nigerian men's basketball players
Olympic basketball players of Nigeria
Power forwards (basketball)
Sportspeople from Edmond, Oklahoma
Utah Jazz players
Virtus Bologna players